Calytrix formosa is a species of plant in the myrtle family Myrtaceae that is endemic to Western Australia.

It usually blooms between September and November producing yellow-pink star-shaped flowers.

Found on sand-plains in a small area along the west coast in the Mid West and Gascoyne regions of Western Australia between Geraldton and Shark Bay where it grows on sand or clay soils.
 
The species was first formally described by the botanist Lyndley Craven in 1987 in the article A taxonomic revision of Calytrix Labill. (Myrtaceae) in the journal Brunonia.

References

Plants described in 1987
formosa
Flora of Western Australia